Manotes is a genus of flies in the family Stratiomyidae.

Species
Manotes crassimanus James, 1980
Manotes flavipes James, 1967
Manotes hyalina James, 1967
Manotes latimanus James, 1967
Manotes plana Kertész, 1916

References

Stratiomyidae
Brachycera genera
Taxa named by Kálmán Kertész
Diptera of North America
Diptera of South America